Sonae is a multinational business group based in Maia, Porto District, Portugal. It is present in 90 countries, operating in several sectors, including retail, financial services, shopping centres management, software and information systems, media and telecommunications.

It is the largest private employer in Portugal, with 53,794 employees.

Sonae is listed on the Euronext PSI-20 in Lisbon, under the code SON.

In the first quarter of 2018, Sonae's turnover amounted to 2,680 million euros, with net results in the order of 98 million euros, more 34.2% than the same period last year.

History 
Sonae was founded in 1959 by the entrepreneur, banker and patron from Arouca, Afonso Pinto de Magalhães. The business group originated from the Sociedade Nacional de Estratificados, an industrial company operating in the area of processed wood, more specifically, in the production of decorative high-pressure laminated panels. During the first two decades of existence, Sonae remained as a small to medium-size business company.

Afonso Pinto de Magalhães, also the founder of the Pinto Magalhães Bank, placed Fábio Lemos in control of Sonae in the turbulent years following the Carnation Revolution. During that period, the company was nationalized and then reprivatized.

In 1982, Afonso Pinto de Magalhães gave 16% of Sonae to Belmiro de Azevedo, who had been admitted to Sonae in 1965. After the death of the founder, Belmiro de Azevedo reached the majority of the capital, with 54.6%, taking control of the company.

During the 1980s, Sonae began its fast growth. In 1985, Sonae Investimentos SGPS, S.A. was created and the group entered the Lisbon Stock Exchange. It was also in the early 1980s that Sonae began its business diversification strategy through acquisitions and the creation of new investments.

The group entered into the modern distribution market by opening the first hypermarket in Portugal, "Continente", in Matosinhos. Two years later, Sonae launched seven takeover bids to seven companies, which allowed the business group to grow in various business areas.

In 1993, Sonae Indústria expanded its investments by acquiring a controlling position in Spanish company Tafisa, which allowed the company to extend its business segment. Posteriorly, another important step was taken when Sonae entered into the specialized retail area with the launch of Worten.

In 1998, with Paulo de Azevedo leading the project, Optimus was born. The mobile operator merged with Zon in 2013, giving rise to NOS.

In 2007, Paulo de Azevedo took over the leadership of the Sonae group, succeeding his father, Belmiro de Azevedo.

In March 2015, Belmiro de Azevedo announced his resignation as Sonae chairman. Paulo de Azevedo was chosen as the new chairman and CEO of the Sonae group, sharing the executive committee presidency with Ângelo Paupério, who was the vice president of Sonae until that point.

In 2018, Cláudia Azevedo was elected executive president of Sonae by the biggest shareholder company of the group, the Efanor. Belmiro de Azevedo's daughter started functions in May 2019, replacing the group Co-CEOs, Paulo de Azevedo and Ângelo Paupério.

Organization
From 2009, Sonae (Sonae SGPS, S.A.) holds a portfolio of businesses grouped into different business areas, where its subholdings are included:

Core Businesses
 Sonae MC – Portuguese leader in the area of food retail, with a set of different formats: Continente (hypermarkets), Continente Modelo (supermarkets), Continente Bom Dia (convenience stores), Continente Ice (specialised in deep frozen food), Meu Super (franchising format of close-by stores), Bom Bocado (restaurant services), Book.it (bookshop) and Well's (drugstores).
 Sonae SR – Responsible for Sonae's non-food related retail area, particularly sports, clothing and electronics, through the brands SportZone (sports), MO (textile), Zippy (Kids clothing and accessories), Worten (household appliances, consumer electronics and entertainment), Worten Mobile (mobile telecommunications), Pets&Plants (garden supplies and articles for pets).

Core Partnerships
 Sonae Sierra – International specialist in shopping centres. Founded in Portugal in 1989, it is owned by Sonae in 50% of the shares. The remaining 50% are owned by Grosvenor Group (United Kingdom)
 Sonaecom – Partnership in the areas of telecommunications, software, information systems and media, which develops an active role in the integrated management of the business units. The universe of companies that are connected to this area is formed by: NOS (telecommunications), Biztech (commercialization of multi-brand IT solutions), WeDo Technologies (supplier of software solutions) and Saphety (simplified solutions and processes automation). In the media area, Sonaecom also owns Público, a reference daily newspaper.

Related Business
 Sonae RP – Created in 2009, Sonae Retail Properties is focused on the management and development of its real estate assets as a way to provide support to its retail business growth goals.

Active Investments
 Investment Management – Business branch responsible for Sonae's mergers and acquisitions. Part of this area are businesses like MDS, Cooper Gay and Herco (in the Insurance sector), Geostar (a travel agency that is a joint-venture with the RAR group) and Maxmat (bricolage in a joint-venture with CRH).

With autonomy since 2007, there is Sonae Capital, presided by Cláudia Azevedo, daughter of Belmiro de Azevedo, with three main business areas:

 Sonae Turismo: Business developer in the resorts, hotel and fitness areas.
 Energy: Management of the co-generation centrals and photovoltaic parks.
 Spread SGPS: Promotions of refrigeration, AVAC and maintenance management and financial participation.

Innovation 
In 2012, Sonae invested more than 70 million Euros in research in the retail sector, in a programme that involved around 3,200 employees. In 2014, Sonae compiled a book with more than 80 innovations developed during 2013, in areas like Health or Technology, many of them with national and international prizes.

Recognition 
Sonae has received awards and distinctions in a number of areas, having been recognised as one of the Most Ethical Companies in the world, as Human Capital Master and with the ICSC Solal Marketing Awards. According to the latest edition of the Global Powers of Retailing report, carried out by Deloitte and the American magazine Stores, Sonae is one of the 250 largest retailers in the world, positioning itself at 155 place, which is equivalent to an increase of 10 places from the previous ranking. In 2015, Sonae's major retail brands were distinguished as "Trusted Brands", according to the international study carried out for the 15th consecutive year by the Reader's Digest Selections. It is the second most desired company to work by Portuguese university students, according to a survey conducted by Spark Agency and Economics and Management School at Minho University. The company was recognized by Kaizen Institute for its continuous improvement. Continente was honoured with the title "Kaizen Ambassador", for its work carried out in store operations, and Worten was the winner in the "Excellence in Quality" category, for its sales force management project.

Sonae brands (Continente, Worten, Sport Zone, Wells and Zippy) were the most valued by consumers, in the fourth edition of Consumer Choice Awards.

Sonae's shopping centers

Portugal 
8.ª Avenida | AlbufeiraShopping | AlgarveShopping | Arrabidashopping | Cascaishopping | CC Continente de Portimão | Colombo Centre | Centro Vasco da Gama | CoimbraShopping | Estação Viana Shopping | GaiaShopping | Guimarães Shopping | LeiriaShopping | LoureShopping | Madeira Shopping | MaiaShopping | Norteshopping | Parque Atlântico | RioSul Shopping | Serra Shopping | Via Catarina | Ponte de Lima

Brazil 
Boavista Shopping | Boulevard Londrina Shopping | Franca Shopping |  Manauara Shopping | Parque D. Pedro | Passeio das Águas Shopping | Shopping Campo Limpo | Shopping Metrópole | Shopping Plaza Sul | Uberlândia Shopping

Spain
Dos mares | GranCasa | La Farga | Luz del Tajo | Max Center | Plaza Mayor | Valle Real | Zubiarte

Italy 
Freccia Rossa | Gli Orsi | Le Terrazze

Germany 
Alexa | Hofgarten Solingen | Loop5 | Münster Arkaden

Greece 
Pantheon Plaza

Romania 
River Plaza Mall (Râmnicu Vâlcea),
Park Lake Plaza (Titan – Bucharest),

In development:
Adora Park Lake (Craiova),
Shopping Plaza (Ploiești).

India
BDA Colony, Happy Ghara

See also
Belmiro de Azevedo
Modelo Continente
Sonae Indústria

References

External links

Companies based in Porto
Conglomerate companies of Portugal
Retail companies established in 1959
Maia, Portugal
Portuguese brands
Portuguese companies established in 1959
Conglomerate companies established in 1959